Israel Hernández Planas (born January 7, 1970 in Santiago de Cuba) is a Cuban judoka. At the 1992 and 1996 Summer Olympics he won bronze medals in the men's Half Lightweight (60–66 kg) category.

References

1970 births
Living people
Judoka at the 1992 Summer Olympics
Judoka at the 1996 Summer Olympics
Judoka at the 1991 Pan American Games
Judoka at the 1995 Pan American Games
Judoka at the 1999 Pan American Games
Olympic judoka of Cuba
Olympic bronze medalists for Cuba
Olympic medalists in judo
Cuban male judoka
Medalists at the 1996 Summer Olympics
Medalists at the 1992 Summer Olympics
Pan American Games silver medalists for Cuba
Pan American Games bronze medalists for Cuba
Pan American Games medalists in judo
Medalists at the 1999 Pan American Games
20th-century Cuban people
21st-century Cuban people